Maninagar is one of the 182 Legislative Assembly constituencies of Gujarat state in India. It is part of Ahmedabad district and is one of the 7 assembly constituencies which make up Ahmedabad West Lok Sabha seat.

Previously, Narendra Modi who was also the Chief Minister of Gujarat had represented this constituency as a Member of the Legislative Assembly till 21 May 2014, when he resigned to assume the position of Prime Minister of India. In the 2012 Gujarat legislative assembly elections, Modi won from this constituency with a majority of 86,373 votes over Sanjiv Bhatt's wife, Shweta, who was contesting for the Indian National Congress.

List of segments
This assembly segment comprises the following wards of Ahmedabad Municipal Corporation.
Ward No. 36 -
Ward No. 36 -
Ward No. 43 -

Members of Legislative Assembly

Election results

2022

2017

2014 Bypoll

2012

2007

2002

1998

See also
 List of constituencies of the Gujarat Legislative Assembly
 Ahmedabad district

References

External links
 

Assembly constituencies of Gujarat
Ahmedabad district